Dave Garrett is a former American sportscaster. He was the play-by-play announcer for the New Orleans Saints, Dallas Cowboys, and Westwood One radio coverage of the National Football League through 2001.

Early life and education
Garrett was raised in Henryetta, Oklahoma, where he attended Henryetta High School. He began his broadcasting career in 1975 at the age of 15 at KHEN-AM 1590/FM 99.5 and broadcast play-by-play for Henryetta High School in 1976 and 1977 seasons. He attended Oklahoma State University 1978-1983.

Early career
After Oklahoma State, Garrett was a broadcaster for KSPI from 1978–1986. He was a fill in play-by-play broadcaster of Oklahoma State Cowboys football games in 1985 for Bob Barry Sr. (while Barry recovered from heart bypass) and also did spot play-by-play for OSU basketball. 

From 1986-87 was sports director at WKY in Oklahoma City, and 1987–1992 was sports talk host on KTOK in Oklahoma City and worked OU football games on the Oklahoma News Network.

NFL Broadcasting

New Orleans Saints
Garrett became the radio play by play announcer of the New Orleans Saints in 1992. He shared the broadcast booth with Archie Manning and Jim Henderson. He also became the sports director of WQUE. 
Midway through the 1993 season, Garrett was relieved of his broadcasting duties after he reportedly overslept and missed a portion of a pregame show prior to a game against the Green Bay Packers. Henderson, the Saints' play-by-play announcer from 1985-89, returned to that role and remained there through the 2017 season.

Dallas Cowboys
Prior to the 1995 season Dallas Cowboys radio play-by-play broadcaster Brad Sham left to become the announcer for the Texas Rangers. Garrett was hired to replace Sham. 

While with the Cowboys Garrett shared the booth with Dale Hansen, and broadcast the Cowboys victory in Super Bowl XXX. He remained in the booth for three seasons until Sham returned to the Cowboys prior to the 1998 season.

Post NFL
Garrett later worked for Oral Roberts University as voice for both Men's and Women's basketball teams (1999-2004).
For the 2003 season only, he was the play-by-play voice for the Oklahoma Redhawks aka the Oklahoma City Dodgers of the Pacific Coast League.In late 2003, Garrett was informed he would not be returning for the 2004 season. 

Garrett took a job with KREF 1400 from 2004-2005. In 2006, he returned to his old job as sports director at KTOK-AM and its new sister station KGHM (AM) 1340. He also hosted a weekday afternoon sports show before briefly ending the show for a few months to focus on his duties as station sports director. He returned to 1340 as host until he was among the employees who lost their jobs as part of nationwide layoffs at Clear Channel Communications in 2012.

From 2013 to 2018, Garrett hosted a local show called "DG On The Radio" on KRXO-FM.
Garrett was the play-by-play broadcaster for Central Oklahoma Bronchos football and Men's and Women's basketball teams from 2007 to 2017.

Personal life
Garrett has been married twice, first marriage or children from it unknown, but he often talked briefly of his first marriage on his broadcasts.   
Currently he makes his home in Oklahoma City, Oklahoma and is married to seconded wife, Rajeana since 2003, together they have two adopted daughters.

References

External links
 KRXO Profile

Living people
People from Henryetta, Oklahoma
American radio sports announcers
American television sports announcers
Minor League Baseball broadcasters
College basketball announcers in the United States
Oklahoma Sooners football announcers
New Orleans Saints announcers
Dallas Cowboys announcers
National Football League announcers
Oklahoma State University alumni
University of Central Oklahoma alumni
1960 births